Shadow banning, also called stealth banning, hellbanning, ghost banning, and comment ghosting, is the practice of blocking or partially blocking a user or the user's content from some areas of an online community in such a way that the ban is not readily apparent to the user, regardless of whether the action is taken by an individual or an algorithm. For example, shadow-banned comments posted to a blog or media website will not be visible to other users accessing the site.

The phrase "shadow banning" has a colloquial history and has undergone some usage evolution. It originally applied to a deceptive sort of account suspension on web forums, where a person would appear to be able to post while actually having all of their content hidden from other users. More recently, the term has come to apply to alternative measures, particularly visibility measures like delisting and downranking.

By partly concealing, or making a user's contributions invisible or less prominent to other members of the service, the hope may be that in the absence of reactions to their comments, the problematic or otherwise out-of-favour user will become bored or frustrated and leave the site, and that spammers and trolls will be discouraged to continue their unwanted behavior or create new accounts.

History 
In the mid-1980s, BBS forums including Citadel BBS software had a "twit bit" for problematic users which, when enabled, would limit the user's access while still allowing them to read public discussions; however, any messages posted by that "twit" would not be visible to the other members of that group.

The term "shadow ban" is believed to have originated with moderators on the website Something Awful in 2001, although the feature was only used briefly and sparsely.

Michael Pryor of Fog Creek Software described stealth banning for online forums in 2006, saying how such a system was in place in the project management system FogBugz, "to solve the problem of how do you get the person to go away and leave you alone". As well as preventing problem users from engaging in flame wars, the system also discouraged spammers, who if they returned to the site would be under the false impression that their spam was still in place. The Verge describes it as "one of the oldest moderation tricks in the book", noting that early versions of vBulletin had a global ignore list known as "Tachy goes to Coventry", as in the British expression "to send someone to Coventry", meaning to ignore them and pretend they do not exist.

A 2012 update to Hacker News introduced a system of "hellbanning" for spamming and abusive behavior.

Early on, Reddit implemented a similar feature, initially designed to address spam accounts. In 2015, Reddit added an account suspension feature that was said to have replaced its sitewide shadowbans, though moderators can still shadowban users from their individual subreddits via their AutoModerator configuration. A Reddit user was accidentally shadow banned for one year in 2019, subsequently they contacted support and their comments were restored.

A study of tweets written in a one-year period during 2014 and 2015 found that over a quarter million tweets had been censored in Turkey via shadow banning. Twitter was also found, in 2015, to have shadowbanned tweets containing leaked documents in the US.

Craigslist has also been known to "ghost" a user's individual ads, whereby the poster gets a confirmation email and may view the ad in their account, but the ad fails to show up in the appropriate category page.

WeChat was found in 2016 to have banned, without notice, posts and messages that contain certain keywords.

In 2017 the phenomenon was noticed on Instagram, with posts which included specific hashtags not showing up when those hashtags were used in searches.

Controversies

Political controversies
"Shadow banning" became popularized in 2018 as a conspiracy theory when Twitter shadow-banned Republicans. In late July 2018, Vice News found that several supporters of the US Republican Party no longer appeared in the auto-populated drop-down search menu on Twitter, thus limiting their visibility when being searched for; Vice News alleged that this was a case of shadow-banning. After the story, some conservatives accused Twitter of enacting a shadowban on Republican accounts, a claim which Twitter denied. However, some accounts that were not overtly political or conservative apparently had the same algorithm applied to them. Numerous news outlets, including The New York Times, The Guardian, Buzzfeed News, Engadget and New York magazine, disputed the Vice News story. In a blog post, Twitter said that the use of the phrase "shadow banning" was inaccurate, as the tweets were still visible by navigating to the home page of the relevant account. In the blog post, Twitter claims it doesn't shadow ban by using "the old, narrow, and classical" definition of shadow banning. Later, Twitter appeared to have adjusted its platform to no longer limit the visibility of some accounts. In a research study that examined more than 2.5 million Twitter profiles, it was discovered that almost one in 40 had been shadowbanned by having their replies hidden or having their handles hidden in searches.

On December 8, 2022, the second thread of the Twitter Files—a series of Twitter threads based on internal Twitter, Inc. documents shared by owner Elon Musk with independent journalists Matt Taibbi and Bari Weiss—addressed a practice referred to as "visibility filtering" by previous Twitter management. The functionality included tools allowing accounts to tagged as "Do not amplify", and under "blacklists" that reduce their prominence in search results and trending topics. It was also revealed that certain accounts, such as the far-right Libs of TikTok, had been given a warning stating that decisions regarding them should only be made by Twitter's Site Integrity Policy, Policy Escalation Support (SIP–PES) team—which consists primarily of high-ranking officials. The functions were given by Musk and other critics as examples of "shadow banning".

Conspiracy theories
A form of conspiracy theory has become popular in which a social media content creator suggests that their content has been intentionally suppressed by a platform which claims not to engage in shadow 
banning. Platforms frequently targeted by these accusations include Twitter, Facebook, YouTube and Instagram.

To explain why users may come to believe they are subject to "shadow bans" even when they are not, Elaine Moore of the Financial Times writes:

See also 
 Ban (law)
 Block (Internet)
 Deplatforming
 Internet censorship
 Kill file
 Section 230 of the Communications Decency Act
 Shunning
 Terms of service
 Twitter suspensions
 Usenet Death Penalty

References

Further reading 

 Trust & Truth Online conference workshops

Internet censorship
Internet trolling
Punishments
Excluded people